The 2006–07 Illinois Fighting Illini men's basketball team represented University of Illinois at Urbana–Champaign in the 2006–07 NCAA Division I men's basketball season.  This was head coach Bruce Weber's fourth season at Illinois. The team finished with 9–7 conference and 21–10 overall records. The Illini advanced to the semifinal round of the Big Ten tournament and were eliminated in the first round of the NCAA tournament.

Roster

Schedule

|-
!colspan=12 style="background:#DF4E38; color:white;"| Exhibition

|-
!colspan=12 style="background:#DF4E38; color:white;"| Non-Conference regular season

|-
!colspan=9 style="background:#DF4E38; color:#FFFFFF;"|Big Ten regular season

|-
!colspan=9 style="text-align: center; background:#DF4E38"|Big Ten tournament

|-
!colspan=9 style="text-align: center; background:#DF4E38"|NCAA tournament

Season statistics

References

Illinois Fighting Illini
Illinois Fighting Illini men's basketball seasons
Illinois
Illinois
Illinois